Alexander or Alex or Sandy Cameron may refer to:

People born before 1900
Alexander Cameron (bishop) (1747–1828), Roman Catholic bishop
Alexander Cameron (British Army officer, born 1781) (1781–1850), British Army general
Alexander Cameron (businessman) (1827–1893), Irish-born businessman and lawyer; founder of the town of Essex, Ontario, Canada
Alexander Cameron (politician) (1834–1917), physician and political figure in Quebec
Alexander F. Cameron (1860–1943), merchant, lumberman and political figure in Nova Scotia
Alexander Cameron (tramways administrator) (1864–1940), first chairman of the Melbourne and Metropolitan Tramways Board
Alexander Donald Cameron (1873–1957), trader of Scottish descent who founded the Tonga Ma'a Tonga Kautaha (Tonga for Tongans Cooperative) in Tonga
Alexander Gordon Cameron (1876–1944), British trades unionist and Labour Party politician
Alexander Thomas Cameron (1882–1947), British-born Canadian biochemist
Alexander Maurice Cameron (1898–1986), British Army general
Alexander Cameron (priest) (1701–1746), Scottish soldier, servant, and Jesuit Priest
Alexander Campbell Cameron (1812–1869), British Conservative politician

People born after 1900
Alexander W. Cameron (1905–1960), Canadian politician in the Nova Scotia House of Assembly
Alexander Beauchamp Cameron (1905–1981), Scottish artist
Alexander C. Cameron (1907–1996), politician in Saskatchewan, Canada
Alex Cameron (academic) (1937–2003), English professor at the University of Dayton
Sandy Cameron (1938–2004), Canadian politician
Alex Cameron (artist) (born 1947), Canadian artist
Alexander Cameron (barrister) (born 1963), English lawyer
Alex Cameron (bishop) (born 1964), Canadian-born American Anglican bishop and son of Sandy Camerson
Alex Cameron (musician) (born c. 1990), Australian musician, singer and songwriter

See also

Cameron Alexander (disambiguation)
Cameron (surname)